Amandine, sometimes Anglicised as almondine, is a culinary term indicating a garnish of almonds. Dishes of this sort are usually cooked with butter and seasonings, then sprinkled with whole or flaked, toasted almonds. 
The term is often spelled almondine in American cookbooks.

Green beans, potatoes, fish, and asparagus are frequently served amandine.

Gallery

See also

 List of cooking techniques
 Meuniere sauce

External sources

 Merriam-Webster definition
 Green Beans Amandine

Cooking techniques
Almond dishes
Culinary terminology